Air Chief Marshal Birender Singh Dhanoa, PVSM, AVSM, YSM, VM, ADC is an Indian air force officer who was the 22nd Chief of the Air Staff of the Indian Air Force and served from 31 December 2016 to 30 September 2019. Dhanoa also served as the Chairman of the Chiefs of Staff Committee.

As of July 2021, Dhanoa is serving as a non-executive and independent director at Hero MotoCorp.

Early life and education
Birender Singh Dhanoa was born in Deoghar in the Indian state of Bihar (now Jharkhand) to Sukhdev Kaur and Sorain Singh in a Jat Sikh family. His ancestral village is Gharuan in the state of Punjab near Chandigarh and Mohali. His father Sorain Singh, an IAS officer, served as the Chief Secretary to the governments of Punjab and Bihar during the 1980s, and later as an advisor to the Punjab state governor, and as an Election Commissioner of India. His grandfather Capt Sant Singh had fought in World War II as a captain of the British Indian Army. He has completed a part of his schooling from St. Xavier's School, Ranchi. He is an alumnus of St. George's College, Mussoorie, where he studied from 1968 to 1969. He thereon joined Rashtriya Indian Military College, Dehradun, and later graduated from National Defence Academy, Pune. He also attended a staff course in Defence Services Staff College, Wellington in 1992.

Career

Dhanoa was commissioned into the fighter stream of the Indian Air Force in June 1978. He has flown various types of fighter jets and is a qualified flying instructor. He has flown fighter aircraft across the spectrum including HJT-16 Kiran, MiG-21, SEPECAT Jaguar, MiG-29 and Su-30MKI. He held several key operational and administrative appointments in his 41 years of career including Director Targeting Cell at Air Headquarters, Director Fighter Operations & War Planning at Headquarters Western Air Command, Assistant Chief of Air Staff (Intelligence) at Air Headquarters, Senior Air Staff Officer of Eastern and Western Air Command and Air Officer Commanding-in-Chief of South Western Air Command (1 November - 31 May 2015). He has held instructional appointments of Senior Air Instructor and Chief Air Instructor at Defence Services Staff College, Wellington and leader of an Indian Air Force Training Team abroad.

Kargil Conflict 

Dhanoa was Commanding Officer of a front line ground attack fighter squadron during the Kargil Conflict in 1999. Under his leadership the squadron devised innovative methods of night bombing at high altitudes which had never been attempted before. His squadron was adjudged the best fighter squadron of HQ WAC. He was awarded Yudh Seva Medal (YSM) and Vayu Sena Medal (VM) for his gallant actions in this conflict.

Before assuming the office of Vice Chief of the Air Staff at Air HQ from Air Marshal Ravi Kant Sharma on 1 June 2015, he was the Air Officer Commanding-in-Chief of the South Western Air Command. Air Marshal Ravinder Kumar Dhir succeeded him as the AOC-in-C of South Western Air Command.

On 17 December 2016, the Government of India designated Air Marshal Dhanoa as the Chief of Staff of the Indian Air Force.

Bilateral visits as CAS

Awards and medals
Dhanoa has been awarded several medals: the Param Vishisht Seva Medal (2016), the Ati Vishisht Seva Medal (2015), the Yudh Seva Medal (1999), and the Vayu Sena Medal (1999). He was also appointed as Honorary ADC to the President of India on 1 August 2015.

References

Chiefs of Air Staff (India)
Vice Chiefs of Air Staff (India)
Living people
Recipients of the Param Vishisht Seva Medal
Recipients of the Ati Vishisht Seva Medal
Indian Air Force officers
Recipients of the Vayu Sena Medal
1957 births
Recipients of the Yudh Seva Medal
Defence Services Staff College alumni
Rashtriya Indian Military College alumni